Avraham Yehoshua Heshel of Apt, popularly known as the Apter Rebbe or Apter Rov, was born in Żmigród, Poland in 1748 and died in Mezhbizh, Russian Empire (now Ukraine) in 1825.

Rabbinical career
A scion of famous rabbinic families, on both his father's and his mother's side (his family can be traced back to Maharam Padua and Saul Wahl), Avraham Yehoshua Heshel showed great promise even at an early age. Acquiring fame as a talmudic scholar, he studied under Rabbi Elimelech of Lizhensk and Rabbi Yechiel Michl of Zlotchov. Becoming one of the foremost spokesmen of the growing Chasidic movement in Poland, he began his career as Rabbi of Kolbuszowa. In 1800 he accepted the post of Rabbi of Apt, or Opatów. Although he held many other rabbinic positions, to the chasidim he remained always the Apter Rov. In 1808 he was chosen as Rabbi of Iaşi, Moldavia. In the wake of communal strife there, he was forced to leave his post and settled in Mezhbizh, the home of the Baal Shem Tov and the cradle of Hasidism, where he devoted himself completely to the study and dissemination of Chasidism.

His daughter, Rachel Ashkenazi, authored several original commentaries on the Torah.

It was during this period in his life, in Mezhbizh, that he gained the veneration of thousands of followers, among whom were a number of the prominent rabbis of the age. His outstanding character trait was his strongly expressed love of the Jewish people, which earned him the title of Oheiv Yisrael, "Lover of Israel". Oheiv Yisrael became the title of the published collection of his thoughts arranged according to the weekly Torah portions. The work abounds with lofty kabbalistic insights and interpretations. It is one of the basic Chasidic texts and bespeaks the Apter Rov's passionate love of his fellow Jews. The Apter Rov is one of the most notable and beloved luminaries in the Hasidic firmament.

On his deathbed, crying bitterly over the long exile, he said: "Before his demise, Rabbi Levi Yitzchak of Berdichev promised that upon entering the World-to-Come he would not rest or sit until Mashiach would come. But they diverted his attention by teaching him lofty and mystical concepts until he forgot his pledge—but I assure you, I will not forget."

He was buried in Mezhbizh, near the Baal Shem Tov. An ornate stone ohel marks his grave in the old Jewish cemetery.  According to one Hasidic legend, angels subsequently carried his body and buried him in the Holy Land, and in the Jewish Cemetery in Tiberias there is a stone marking his supposed grave.

The Hasidic dynasty of Mezhbizh/Zinkov

Rabbi Avraham Yehoshua Heshel of Apt was the founder of the Mezhbizh/Zinkover rabbinic dynasty. In honor of the dynasty's founder, his descendants adopted the family name Heshel.

References

Chapin, David A. and Weinstock, Ben, The Road from Letichev: The history and culture of a forgotten Jewish community in Eastern Europe, Volume 1.  iUniverse, Lincoln, NE, 2000.
Kaplan, Aryeh (1991) Chasidic Masters: History, Biography, Thought. Moznaim Publishing Corporation.
Rabinowicz, Tzvi M. The Encyclopedia of Hasidism:  Jason Aronson, Inc., 1996.
Finkel, Avraham Y. The Great Chasidic Masters:  Jason Aronson, Inc., 1992.

1748 births
1825 deaths
People from Jasło County
Hasidic rebbes
Hasidic rabbis in Europe
Polish Hasidic rabbis
Rabbis